Erin Taylor (born 8 June 1987) is a New Zealand sprint canoeist who competed in the late 2000s. At the 2008 Summer Olympics in Beijing, she was eliminated in the semifinals of the K-1 500 m event.

References

1987 births
Canoeists at the 2008 Summer Olympics
Canoeists at the 2012 Summer Olympics
Living people
New Zealand female canoeists
Olympic canoeists of New Zealand